Duke of Orleans Land is a land area —possibly a peninsula— in King Frederick VIII Land, northeastern Greenland. Administratively it belongs to the NE Greenland National Park area.

Geography
The Duke of Orleans Land is bounded in the north by the Zachariae Isstrom, beyond which rises Lambert Land, in the east by the Jokel Bay of the Greenland Sea, in the south by the Kofoed-Hansen Glacier, beyond which rises Nordmarken. To the west rises the Greenland Ice Sheet.

The Bildsøe Nunatak rises roughly in the central area. Other important nunataks in the area are the Laub Nunataks, Gronne Nunatak, Garde Nunataks, Mokke Nunataks and Pic de Gerlache. Near the northern end flows the Gammel Hellerup Glacier into Jokel Bay and the Blæse Glacier further south. The area is largely glaciated and it includes the  Sønderland, Søndre Mellemland, Mellemland and Nørreland —with the Norre Biland and Nørre Mellemland— sections. The Alabama Nunatak rises beyond the SW end.

History
Duke of Orleans Land was named in 1905 by the Prince Philippe, Duke of Orléans during his Arctic Expedition on ship Belgica, when he explored parts of the northeastern coast of Greenland. Initially the Duke named it Terre de France (French Land), but the Danish administration vetoed the name. 
Following consultations with Belgian explorer Adrien de Gerlache (1866–1934), the 1906–08 Danmark Expedition placed the name "Duke of Orleans Land" in the present location.

References

External links
Regional Caledonian structure of Hertugen af Orleans Land, North-East Greenland
The Arctic voyages of Louis-Philippe-Robert, Duc d'Orléans

Peninsulas of Greenland

fr:Terre du duc d'Orléans
nl:Hertogen van Orléansland